Aric Termain Morris (born July 22, 1977) is a former American football safety in the National Football League. He was drafted in the fifth round of the 2000 NFL Draft. He played four seasons in the NFL for the Tennessee Titans and New England Patriots. He played college football at Michigan State University. Morris played four games during the Patriots' 2003 season which culminated in them winning Super Bowl XXXVIII.

Morris played high school football at Berkley High School in Berkley, Michigan.

References

1977 births
Players of American football from Winston-Salem, North Carolina
American football safeties
Michigan State Spartans football players
Tennessee Titans players
New England Patriots players
People from Berkley, Michigan
Living people